William Edward Hayes (8 November 1895 – after 1928) was an English professional footballer who played as a goalkeeper. He began his senior career with Preston North End, where he made 10 league appearances, all of them in the 1914–15 season. During the First World War, he played one match as a guest for Burnley. After the war, Hayes played for several clubs including Brighton & Hove Albion and Southend United, playing more than 250 league matches. Towards the end of his career, he played for a number of non-League sides.

References

1895 births
Year of death missing
People from Croston
English footballers
Association football goalkeepers
Preston North End F.C. players
Chorley F.C. players
Brighton & Hove Albion F.C. players
Southend United F.C. players
Accrington Stanley F.C. (1891) players
Stockport County F.C. players
Winsford United F.C. players
Burscough F.C. players
Stalybridge Celtic F.C. players
Bacup Borough F.C. players
English Football League players
Southern Football League players
Burnley F.C. wartime guest players